The 1996 Benson & Hedges Cup was the twenty-fifth edition of cricket's Benson & Hedges Cup. It was an English limited overs county cricket tournament which was held between 26 April and 13 July 1996.

The competition was won by Lancashire County Cricket Club for a record fourth time, defeating Northamptonshire County Cricket Club by 31 runs in the final at Lord's on 13 July 1996.

Format
At the TCCB's winter meeting on 13 December 1995, it was agreed to reduce the format of the cup from 55 to 50 overs a side.

Fixtures and results

Group stage

Group A

Source:

Group B

Source:

Group C

Source:

Group D

Source:

Quarter-finals

Semi-finals

Final

References

See also
Benson & Hedges Cup

Benson & Hedges Cup seasons
1996 in English cricket